Half Way to Heaven (Swedish: Halvvägs till himlen) is a 1931 drama film directed by Rune Carlsten and Stellan Windrow and starring Elisabeth Frisk, Edvin Adolphson and Karin Swanström. It was produced and distributed by the Swedish subsidiary of Paramount Pictures at the company's Joinville Studios. It was one of a large number of multiple-language versions shot at Joinville during the early years of the sound era. It is a Swedish-language remake of the 1929 Hollywood film of the same title.

Cast
 Elisabeth Frisk as Mona
 Haakon Hjelde as Ned Lee
 Edvin Adolphson as Nick Pogli
 Karin Swanström as Madame Jenny
 Torben Meyer as Director
 Einar Sissener as Jack
 Mildred Mehle

References

Bibliography 
 Waldman, Harry. Missing Reels: Lost Films of American and European Cinema. McFarland, 2000.
 Wredlund, Bertil & Lindfors, Rolf. Långfilm i Sverige: 1930-1939. Proprius, 1983.

External links 
 

1931 films
American drama films
Swedish drama films
1931 drama films
1930s Swedish-language films
Films directed by Rune Carlsten
Swedish black-and-white films
Films shot at Joinville Studios
Paramount Pictures films
Films set in Chicago
1930s American films
1930s Swedish films